The International Centre for Radio Astronomy Research (ICRAR) is an international "centre of excellence" in astronomical science and technology based in Perth, Western Australia, launched in August 2009 as a joint venture between Curtin University and the University of Western Australia. The ICRAR attracts researchers in radio astronomy, contributing to Australian and international scientific and technical programs for the international Square Kilometre Array (SKA) project, the world's biggest ground-based telescope array which is in its design phase and the two Australian SKA precursors, the Australian Square Kilometre Array Pathfinder (ASKAP) and the Murchison Widefield Array (MWA), both located in Murchison. The headquarters of the ICRAR is located in Crawley.

Aims
The ICRAR seeks to:

 Create a collaborative environment for scientists and engineers to engage and work with industry to produce studies, prototypes and systems linked to the overall scientific success of the SKA, MWA and ASKAP.
 Enhance Australia's position in the international SKA program by contributing to the development process for the SKA in scientific, technological and operational areas.
 Promote scientific, technical, commercial and educational opportunities through public outreach, educational material, training students and collaborative developments with national and international educational organisations.
 Establish and maintain a pool of emerging and top-level scientists and technologists in the disciplines related to radio astronomy through appointments and training.
 Make contributions to SKA science, with emphasis on the signature science themes associated with surveys for neutral hydrogen and variable (transient) radio sources.
 Make contributions to SKA capability with respect to developments in the areas of Data Intensive Science and support for the Murchison Radio-astronomy Observatory.

Participants
ICRAR is an equal joint venture between Curtin University and the University of Western Australia, with funding support from the state government. The Centre’s headquarters are located at the UWA, with research nodes at both the UWA and the Curtin Institute of Radio Astronomy (CIRA).

Management
ICRAR is governed by a board, inaugurally chaired by Bernard Bowen, (February 2009 - July 2016). The current chair is Ken Michael, appointed January 2015. The executive director is Peter Quinn.

Pawsey Supercomputing Centre
In 2013, the ICRAR became the first user of the Pawsey Supercomputing Centre, based in Kensington.

theSkyNet 
As part of its programme, ICRAR utilised distributed computing to support its own resources. theSkyNet POGS was a public research project that employed Internet-connected computers to do research in astronomy using BOINC technology. It combined the spectral coverage of the GALEX, Pan-STARRS1, and WISE to generate a multi-wavelength (ultra-violet - optical - near infra-red) galaxy atlas for the nearby Universe. It calculates physical parameters such as star formation rate, stellar mass of the galaxy, dust attenuation, and total dust mass of a galaxy on a pixel-by-pixel basis using spectral energy distribution fitting techniques. In September 2014 theSkyNet had 13573 users with credit and 5198 users with recent credit. theSkyNet was powered down in 2018.

AstroQuest 
This is the latest citizen science project launched by ICRAR, and aims to help Australian scientists understand how galaxies grow and evolve. Anyone can sign up to become an AstroQuester if you've got access to the internet and a computer or laptop. Users inspect galaxies and let astronomers know if the computer has guessed about the galaxy's light properly or not. You use simple paint tools to paint over the galaxy's light and light coming from other sources. There's even a leaderboard and quests to complete.

History
In 2022, an unusual slow periodic radio transient was discovered in archival data in GLEAM (GaLactic and Extragalactic All-sky Murchison Widefield Array Survey), catalogued as GLEAM-XJ162759.5-523504, the astrophysical radio source had an 18 minute period with 1 minute long bursts, not matching any then known periodic variables.

See also 
 List of astronomical societies

References 

Astronomy organizations
Astronomy in Australia
Radio astronomy
Scientific organizations established in 2009